Auchenharvie is an area of Stevenston, North Ayrshire in Scotland.

There are therefore several local institutions, organizations and businesses that use this name. These include:
 Auchenharvie Colliery
 Auchenharvie Academy
 Auchenharvie House and estate.
Also using the same name, but some distance away near Torranyard, is Auchenharvie Castle.

References 

Villages in North Ayrshire
Ardrossan−Saltcoats−Stevenston